Chlorobapta is a genus of beetles  belonging to the family Scarabaeidae, subfamily Cetoniinae.

References 

Scarabaeidae genera
Cetoniinae